Miikka is a Finnish name of the following people:

Miikka Anttila (born 1972), Finnish rally co-driver
Miikka Ilo (born 1982), Finnish footballer
Miikka Kiprusoff (born 1976), Finnish ice hockey player
Miikka Männikkö (born 1979), Finnish ice hockey player
Miikka Mujunen (born 1996), Finnish footballer
Miikka Multaharju (born 1977), Finnish footballer
Miikka Oinonen (born 1983), Finnish footballer
Miikka Pitkänen (born 1996), Finnish ice hockey player
Miikka Salomäki (born 1993), Finnish ice hockey player
Miikka Toivola (1949–2017), Finnish footballer
Miikka Tuomainen (born 1986), Finnish ice hockey player
Miikka Turunen (born 1979), Finnish footballer

Finnish masculine given names